Douglas Henry McKittrick (born 18 February 1953) is a retired Archdeacon of Chichester.

McKittrick was educated at John Marlay School in Newcastle-upon-Tyne and at St Stephen's House, Oxford. He was ordained in 1977  and after curacies at St Paul's Deptford and St John's Tuebrook held two incumbencies in Liverpool. He was then vicar of St Peter's Brighton until his appointment to the archdeaconry. He was also an active member of the Liberal/Liberal Democrats. He was a Liverpool Councillor for Aigburth from 1986-1994.

He retired on 1 July 2018.

References

1953 births
Archdeacons of Chichester
Living people